Sosnówka  is a village in the administrative district of Gmina Podgórzyn, within Karkonosze County, Lower Silesian Voivodeship, in south-western Poland.

The village has a population of 1,200.

External links
Archived official website

Villages in Karkonosze County